Kbel is a municipality and village in Kolín District in the Central Bohemian Region of the Czech Republic. It has about 200 inhabitants.

Administrative parts
The village of Kbílek is an administrative part of Kbel.

References

Villages in Kolín District